Ballymoney (meaning 'townland of the moor') is a town and civil parish in County Antrim, Northern Ireland. It is within the Causeway Coast and Glens Borough Council area. The civil parish of Ballymoney is situated in the historic baronies of Dunluce Upper and Kilconway in County Antrim, as well as the barony of North East Liberties of Coleraine in County Londonderry. It had a population of 10,402 people at the 2011 Census.

Ballymoney is located on the main road between Coleraine and Ballymena, with good road and rail connections to the main cities in Northern Ireland, Belfast and Derry.

The Ballymoney area has the highest life expectancy of any area in Northern Ireland, with the average male life expectancy at birth being 79.9 years and 83.8 years for females in years between 2010 and 2012. Conversely, it was revealed in 2013 that Ballymoney residents are more likely to die from heart disease than anywhere else in Northern Ireland.

The town hosts the Ballymoney Drama Festival, the oldest drama festival in Ireland, which was founded in 1933. The town also hosts the Ballymoney Show, which is one of the oldest agricultural shows in Northern Ireland and was founded in 1902.

History

16th and 17th century 
In 1556, an account of an English expedition against the MacDonnells, a sept of the Scottish Clan Donald that lorded over a wide expanse of north and east Antrim known as the Route and Glynns, records "a bishop's house, which was with a castle and a church joined together in one, called Ballymonyn". Destroyed in the Irish Rebellion of 1641, no vestige of the bishop's house or castle remains, but a surviving tower of a church built in 1637 by Sir Randall MacDonnell is today the oldest structure in Ballymoney.

In the wake of the devastation caused by the Tudor Conquest of Ulster, Sir Randall had invited settlers from lowland Scotland. Unlike the MacDonnells and the native Irish, the majority of these were not Roman Catholics, but neither did they recognise the episcopacy of the reformed church established under the British Crown. Conscious of their disabilities both as "dissenters" from the established church and as tenants at will, after two/three generations these Scottish Presbyterians began to leave in search of opportunity elsewhere.

18th century 
In summer 1718, people from Ballymoney and the surrounding area waved goodbye to five ships carrying Presbyterian ministers and their congregations across the Atlantic to start new lives in New England. This was among the early wave of departures that, in the course of the coming decades, was to carry tens of thousands of "Scots-Irish" to the New World.

From 1778, inspired by the revolt of their kinsmen in the America colonies, the disaffection among the people of the town and district took a more radical turn, first in the drilling and political conventions of the Volunteer militia, and then from 1795, with the additional impetus of the French Revolution, in the Society of United Irishmen. The "test" or pledge of the Society "to form a Brotherhood of affection amongst Irishmen of every religious persuasion" so as to secure an “equal representation of all the people in Ireland", was administered by leading residents of the town, among them a doctor, a schoolmaster and two attorneys. When in June 1798, having despaired of parliamentary reform, the Society called for insurrection, men assembled on Dungobery Hill, parading with guns, pikes, pitchforks and scythes tied upon sticks. Although they quickly dispersed on news of the defeat of the larger rebel host at Antrim town, reprisals were taken. Government troops burned the town, and many of the rebels were either hanged or "sent for transportation" (to the West Indies or to the penal colony of New South Wales). The young licentiate minister, Richard Caldwell, who had had command of the rebels found exile in the United States, there to die in War of 1812 in a march on Canada.

19th century 
In 1837, Lewis's Topographical Dictionary of Ireland, describes Ballymoney as "a market-town and post-town" containing 2,222 inhabitants (11,579 in the broader civil parish) with a long established linen market chiefly supplying the London market, and with "a very extensive trade ... in grain, butter, pork, and general provisions". Transport was largely via the Bann. By 1860, the town was connected to both Belfast and Derry by rail.

At the height of the Great Famine in 1847, entire families were being admitted to the Ballymoney Workhouse.  At one point it became vastly overcrowded with 870 inmates. The destitute families were separated, men, women and children being subject to demanding work regimes. By the end of the century the number of people seeking relief had declined and the workhouse closed in 1918. It later became the site of the Route Hospital.

In the decades following the famine, the issue of tenant right challenged large landowners who as "loyalists" and "unionists" believed they might count on the popular vote. Inspired by the electoral successes of James MacKnight and Samuel MacCurdy Greer in neighboring County Londonderry, in 1869 the Rev. James Armour and others in Ballymoney formed the Route Tenants Defence Association. In 1874, the association organised a major North-South National Tenants Rights conference in Belfast which called for loans to facilitate tenant purchase of land and for breaking the landlord monopoly on local government.

20th century 

After the turn of the century there was local support for the Independent Orange Order, promoted by its first Imperial Grand Master, Lindsay Crawford (an admirer of the United Irishmen), as an expression of "progressive Protestantism". In 1906, the IOO supported the election of Liberal, R. G. Glendinning due largely to his support for compulsory land purchase.

By the time of the Home Rule Crisis of 1912–14, the land question had resolved largely in the tenants' favour, and official unionism reasserted itself.  A meeting in Ballymoney Town Hall in October 1913 organised by Armour and Ballymena's Jack White, and with Sir Roger Casement and Alice Stopford Green on the platform, disputed the claim of Edward Carson's Unionists to speak for northern Protestants. Local historian Alex Blair notes, "the meeting put Ballymoney into the press headlines across the United Kingdom. All the big London papers had a representative in the Town Hall and ‘The London Times’ carried an editorial as well as a report". But while the dissident meeting had filled the hall, in November an anti-Home Rule meeting addressed by Carson's lieutenant Sir James Craig had the crowd spilling out of the hall into the surrounding streets.

Broadly in line with its three-quarters Protestant majority, Ballymoney remained a Unionist town. From 1921 its Antrim, and later Bannside, constituencies returned Ulster Unionists to the Northern Ireland Parliament virtually unopposed. This ended only in February 1969, when standing as a Protestant Unionist, the Rev. Ian Paisley came within a few percentage points of unseating the Prime Minister of Northern Ireland, Captain Terence O'Neill.

This was at the onset of the Northern Irish Troubles, in the course of which Ballymoney and its immediate surroundings witnessed 14 conflict-related deaths. Seven people were killed by various loyalist groups, four by the Irish Republican Army (IRA), and three by the British Army. The most notorious incident occurred at the height of the Drumcree protests, three months after the 1998 "Good Friday" Agreement under which both republican and loyalist paramilitaries committed to permanent ceasefires. The Ulster Volunteer Force petrol bombed a house in a predominantly Protestant area of the town killing three Catholic children, the Quinn brothers.

The last major flax-spinning operation in the area, the Balnamore Mill, made its final shipment of linen (to Germany) and closed its doors in 1959. The same year, saw the camera manufacturer K.G. Corfield moved from Wolverhampton to Ballymoney, becoming the only camera manufacturers on the island of Ireland. But this surprise addition to Ballymoney's shrinking indusrial base failed in the face of Japanese and German competition. It ceased production in 1971. A further blow to the local economy was delivered in 1988 by a fire that destroyed the Lovell and Christmas pig processing factory that had  employed more than 400 people and processed about 40% of Northern Ireland's pork.

21st century 
In the 21st century, Ballymoney recovered an ability to attract industrial investment. Examples included a 2015 €6.8 million expansion in the operations of McAuley Engineering, and the announcement in June 2022 of a £9 million expansion of the metal fabricator facility of the U.S. machinery giant Terex.

In the 30 years between the 1981 census and the 2011 census, the population of the town almost doubled from 5,679 to 10,393 people. In the broader-than-the-town census area, the population rose from 26,865 in 2001 to 32,505 in 2020.

Politics
Ballymoney district is part of the Causeway Coast and Glens Borough Council. In 2014, the residents elected 3 Democratic Unionist Party, 2 Ulster Unionist Party, 1 Traditional Unionist Voice and 1 Sinn Féin councillors. It is within the North Antrim constituency which in 2019 returned Ian Paisly Jr, Democratic Unionist, to Westminster, and in 2022 returned to the Northern Ireland Assembly one Ulster Unionist, one Democratic Unionist, one Traditional Unionist Voice, one Sinn Féin and one Alliance member.

Demographics
On Census day (27 March 2011) there were 10,402 people living in the town of Ballymoney (4,354 households), an increase of 15.3% on the Census 2001 population of 9,021. Of these:

 19.75% were aged under 16 years and 16.91% were aged 65 and over;
 52.84% of the usually resident population were female and 47.16% were male;
 76.23% belong to or were brought up in a 'Protestant and Other Christian (including Christian related)' faith and 17.17% belong to or were brought up in the Catholic Christian faith;
 73.34% indicated that they had a British national identity, 28.11% had a Northern Irish national identity and 6.78% had an Irish national identity (respondents could indicate more than one national identity);
 39 years was the average (median) age of the population;
 32.05% had some knowledge of Ulster-Scots and 4.01% had some knowledge of Irish (Gaelic).

Buildings of note

Ballymoney is one of the oldest towns in Ireland with many buildings of historic note in the town centre.
 An old church tower dating from 1637 is the town's oldest surviving building.
 Another striking feature is the town clock and masonic hall, commissioned by the Randal William MacDonnell, 6th Earl of Antrim in 1775. The hall was used as a market house, courthouse, town hall and school.
 Ballymoney Town Hall was erected in 1866.

Education

Primary schools
Ballymoney Primary School
Ballymoney Primary School, also known as Ballymoney Model, is situated at the top of the North Road and holds approximately 360 pupils each year. The school is within the Northern Eastern Education Library Board area. Historically, Ballymoney Primary has been a predominately protestant school, but was scheduled to be integrated in September 2009 following a very narrow vote in favour of the idea.
Garryduff Primary School
Garryduff primary school is for pupils aged 4–11, it is located on the Garryduff road approximately 3 miles out of Ballymoney it has got a new extension with a new multi-purpose hall and a new classroom.
Landhead Primary School
Landhead Primary School is a primary school for pupils aged 5 to 11 years, located on the Kilraughts Road, close to Ballymoney Rugby Club. In 2004 the Sunday Mirror reported on the school's cat "Tigger". The cat has since featured on local news and radio programmes.
 Leaney Primary School 
Leaney Primary School is located near Ballymoney High School, on Intermediate Road, approximately 1 mile from the town centre. The school for children aged 4 to 11, is a part of the Eco-Schools programme which aims to raise pupils awareness of sustainable development issues.
Lislagan Primary School
Lislagan Primary School is located about three miles from Ballymoney, in a rural location. It is a controlled school for girls and boys aged from 3 to 11. As of 2006, enrollment stood at 94. It is within the North Eastern Education and Library Board area.
St. Brigid's Primary School
St. Brigid's Primary School is located in Castle Street.

Secondary schools
Ballymoney High School
Dalriada School
Our Lady of Lourdes High School, Ballymoney

College
 Northern Regional College, Ballymoney campus

Sport 
Association football clubs in the area include Ballymoney United F.C. and Glebe Rangers F.C.

Transport 
Ballymoney railway station opened on 4 December 1855, and was closed to goods traffic on 4 January 1965. The refurbished railway station was opened in May 1990. It was one terminus of the Ballycastle Railway, a narrow gauge railway which ran 17 miles connecting Ballycastle to Ballymoney, on the Belfast and Northern Counties Railway (BNCR), later Northern Counties Committee (NCC), main line to Derry, and closed in July 1950.

Economy and media 
Maine Soft Drinks Ltd is based in the area.

The Ballymoney Chronicle was established in 1844. It is the largest selling weekly newspaper in the North Coast and the second largest weekly newspaper in Northern Ireland.

People

Arts and Media
Patrick Boyle (1905–1982), novelist.
George Shiels (1881–1949), Popular playwright of early 20th century.
Jimmy Young (1918–1974), a successful comedian, was born in Ballymoney.

Politics
J.B. Armour (1841–1928), cleric, educationalist and Home Rule activist.
Thomas McKean (1734–1817), a prominent figure in the American Revolution, was the son of an emigrant from Ballymoney.
Sir William Moore (1864–1944), Unionist politician and judge.
William Robinson (1823–1912), Conservative Ontario politician.
John Pinkerton (1845–1908), Tenant righter and Irish Parliamentary Party MP.
John Robb (1932-2018), surgeon and member of Seanad Éireann.
John Tennant (1777–1813) born at Roseyards near Ballymoney, leading United Irishman, killed in the service of Napoleon's Irish Legion.

Sports
Adrian Archibald (b.1969), motor cycle racer.
Stephen Carson (b.1980), former Northern Ireland Under-21 international footballer, who plays for Coleraine in the IFA Premiership.
Peter Chambers (b.1990), rower; Silver medal in the men's lightweight four at the 2012 Summer Olympics.
Karen Corr (b.1969), pool and snooker player.
Stephen Dooley (b.1991), professional footballer.
Joey Dunlop (1952–2000), known as the "King of the Road", was five times the World Motorcycle Champion.
Robert Dunlop (1960–2008), motor cycle racer, Joey Dunlop's brother
Mabel Harrison (1886-1972), golfer, died at Ballymoney
James Hopkins (1901–1943), professional footballer.
Gary Kelly (b.1989), Bowls World Cup Singles champion
Gareth McAuley (b.1992), sport shooter
Bridget McKeever (b.1983), a former Ireland women's field hockey international.
Jim Platt (b.1952), former Middlesbrough and Northern Ireland goalkeeper.
Damien Quinn (b.1980), captain of the Antrim senior hurling team.
Chris Turner (b.1987), former Northern Ireland Under-21 international footballer.
Davy Tweed (1959–2021), rugby player, Unionist politician

Town twinning
 Benbrook, Texas, United States
 Vanves, France
 Douglas, Isle of Man

See also
List of localities in Northern Ireland by population
List of civil parishes of County Antrim
Market Houses in Northern Ireland

References

External links

Visit Ballymoney
Culture Northern Ireland website (archived 2008)

 
Towns in County Antrim
Civil parish of Ballymoney